Tillite Glacier is a tributary glacier flowing northwest from Pagoda Peak in Queen Alexandra Range to join Lennox-King Glacier north of Fairchild Peak. So named by New Zealand Geological Survey Antarctic Expedition (NZGSAE) (1961–62) because it contains outcrops of ancient moraine (tillite), indicative of glacial action in remote Paleozoic times.

Glaciers of the Ross Dependency
Shackleton Coast